Professor Emmanuel Gyimah-Boadi is a Ghanaian political scientist and the co-founder of the Afrobarometer, a pan-African research project that surveys public attitude on political, social and economic reforms across African countries. He was the CEO of Afrobarometer from 2008 to 2021. He is now the chair of its board of directors.

He is also founder and former executive director of the Ghana Center for Democratic Development (CDD-Ghana). A former professor in the Department of Political Science at the University of Ghana, Legon, he has held faculty positions at universities in the United States, including the School of International Service of the American University (Washington, D.C.), and fellowships at the Center for Democracy, Rule of Law and Development (Stanford University), the Woodrow Wilson International Center for Scholars, the U.S. Institute of Peace, and the International Forum for Democratic Development (all in Washington, D.C.). He is a fellow of the Ghana Academy of Arts and Sciences and a member of the editorial board of the Journal of Democracy. He has sat on advisory councils of numerous International Non-Governmental Organisations around the globe, including the Ibrahim Index of African Governance (London), and International Center for Transitional Justice (New York), the Institute for Integrated Transitions (Barcelona), among others.

He is also a staunch advocate for democracy, the rule of law, and inclusive governance, and has dedicated a lifelong career to capacity building in public opinion survey research on the African continent. In his writings, he has consistently underscored the surprising depth and resilience of citizens’ demand for democracy, and the importance of good governance to sustainable development and democracy in Africa.

Born on October 2, 1953, in Abirem in the Eastern region of Ghana, Professor Gyimah-Boadi completed his bachelor’s degree at the University of Ghana. He obtained his masters and doctoral degrees in political science at the University of California, Davis. He joined the Political Science Department at the University of Ghana in 1986 and retired in 2014 after nearly three decades of dedicated service. In 1999, he co-founded CDD-Ghana, where he served as executive director till February 2018.   

Professor Gyimah-Boadi is a widely cited scholar on democratic politics in Africa. He has published more than a dozen books and monographs, several influential peer-reviewed journal articles, and more than thirty book chapters. According to Google Scholar, Gyimah’s work has been cited over 6,000 times. Some of his best-known works include his co-authored book on Public opinion, democracy, and market reform in Africa (2005, Cambridge University Press) and his edited volume on Democratic Reform in Africa: Quality of Progress (2004, Lynne Rienner). His impact in the field of African Studies is fundamental with his articles on “The Rebirth of African Liberalism” and “Civil Society in Africa” in the Journal of Democracy and the book chapter “Associational Life, Civil Society, and Democratization in Ghana,” helping to shape the field of democracy studies in Africa.       
 
Beyond his academic accomplishments, Gyimah-Boadi is an affable conversationalist, a connoisseur of food and wine, and a jazz lover.

Education 
Gyimah-Boadi holds a Bachelor of Arts in Political Science from University of Ghana and a Master of Arts and Ph.D in Political Science from the University of California, Davis.

Career 
He was a professor at the University of Ghana, in the Department of Political Science, from 1986 to 2014. He was the executive director of the Ghana Center for Democratic Development, a research and advocacy institute he co-founded.

Research 
Gyimah-Boadi's research centers around democratic politics in Africa. In particular, he has studied extensively political reforms and liberalism in Ghana.

Honors and awards 
In 2021, Professor Gyimah-Boadi was named one of ‘100 Most Influential Africans' by New African Magazine  

In 2019, he became an international member of the US National Academy of Sciences.

In 2018, he won the 2018 Distinguished Africanist Award of the African Studies Association of USA for his outstanding scholarship and service to the Africanist community. 

In 2017, he received the Martin Luther King, Jr. Award for Peace and Social Justice, given by the US embassy to Ghana for advancing democracy, good governance, and economic opportunity.

Professional Fellowships 
United States National Academy of Sciences

Ghana Academy of Arts and Sciences

International Center for Transitional Justice

Center for Democracy, Rule of Law and Development (Stanford University) 

Woodrow Wilson International Center for Scholars

U.S. Institute of Peace

International Forum for Democratic Development

Publications 

“Will Africans’ calls for better democracy be met?” (with Carolyn Logan and Joseph Asunka), The World Today, Chatham House (August 2022).

“West Africa’s Authoritarian Turn Democratic Backsliding, Youth Resistance, and the Case for American Help,” Foreign Affairs (July 2022).

“Institutional resources for overcoming Africa’s COVID-19 crisis and enhancing prospects for post-pandemic reconstruction,” Foresight Africa (Brookings Institution, January 2021). 

“Africans' Durable Demand for Democracy” (with Carolyn Logan and Josephine Sanny), Journal of Democracy Vol. 32, No. 3 (July 2021) pp. 136-151.
“US policy towards Africa: An Africa citizen perspective” (with Landry Singe and Josephine Sanny), Africa in Focus (Brookings Institution, October 2020).

“Democracy Delivery Falls Short”, Journal of Democracy Vol. 30, No.30 (July 2019) pp. 86-94  

Making Democracy Work for the People: reflections on Ghana’s 25-year Journey towards democratic development (CDD-Ghana, 2018)

“Africa’s Waning Democratic Commitment,” Journal of Democracy vol. 26, no. 1 (January 2015)

“Political Risks Facing African Democracies: evidence from the Afrobarometer” (with Mike Bratton) Afrobarometer Working Paper, 157 (2015)

“Ghana: The Limits of External Democracy Assistance” (with Theo Yakah) in Danielle Resnick and Nicolas van de Walle eds, Democratic Trajectories in Africa: Unraveling the Impact of Foreign Aid (Oxford University Press, 2013), pp.256-280 

“Oil, Politics and Ghana’s Democracy” (with H. Kwasi Prempeh), Journal of Democracy, Vol.23 No.3 July 2012, pp. 94-108 

“Another Step Ahead for Ghana,” Journal of Democracy, Vol. 20, No. 2 (April 2009), pp. 138-15

“Corruption and Institutional Trust in Africa: implications for democratic development” (with Daniel Armah-Attoh and Annie Chikwanha) Afrobarometer Working Paper 40 (2007)  

Political Parties, Elections and Patronage: Random Thoughts on Neo-Patrimonialism and African Democratization” in Matthias Basedau, Gero Erdmann and Andreas Mehler eds., Votes, Money and Violence: Political Parties and Elections in Sub-Saharan Africa (Sweden, Nordiska Afrikainstitutet, 2007) pp. 21-33 

“Politics in Ghana Since 1957: The Quest for Freedom, National Unity and Prosperity” Ghana Studies V. 10 (2007), pp. 107-143

“Ethnic Structure, Inequality and Public Sector Governance in Ghana” (with Richard Asante) in Yusuf Bangura ed., Ethnic Inequalities and Public Sector Governance (Palgrave, 2006) pp. 241-260

The Quest for the ‘Developmental State’ in Africa: What Has Liberal Democracy Got to Do With It? (Accra: Ghana Universities Press, 2010)

“Ghana and South Africa, Assessing the Quality of Democracy” (with Robert Mattes) in Larry Diamond and Leonardo Morlino eds., Assessing the Quality of Democracy (Baltimore, The Johns Hopkins University Press, 2005) pp. 238-273

Public Opinion, Democracy and Market Reform in Africa (With Mike Bratton and Robert Mattes) Cambridge University Press (2005). 

Democratic Reform in Africa: The Quality of Progress, Boulder, CO: Lynne Rienner Publishers, (2004)

“Ghana: the political economy of ‘successful’ ethno-regional management” in Robin Luckham et al eds. Can Democracy be Designed? (London: Zed Press, 2003) pp. 120-137 

“Confronting Corruption in Ghana and Africa”, CDD-Ghana Briefing Paper vol.4, no. 2 (2007)

“Constituencies for Reform in Ghana” (with Michael Bratton and Peter Lewis) Journal of Modern Africa Studies, Vol. 39, No. 2 (2001) pp. 231- 259

“A Peaceful Turnover in Ghana” Journal of Democracy, Vol. 12, No. 2 (April 2001), pp. 103-117  

“The Political Economy of Reform” (with Richard Jeffries) in Ernest Aryeetey, Jane Harrigan and Machiko Nissanke eds. Economic Reforms in Ghana: The Miracle & the Mirage (Oxford: James Currey Publishers, 2000) pp. 32-50 

“Ghana: The Challenge of Consolidating Democracy” in Richard Joseph ed., State, Conflict and Democracy in Africa, Lynne Rienner Publishers, Boulder Co. (1999).

"Economic Reform and Political Liberalization in Ghana and Cote d'Ivoire: A Preliminary Assessment of Implications for Nation Building" (with Cyril Daddieh) in Kidane Mengisteab and Cyril Daddieh eds, State Building and Democratization in Africa, Faith, Hope and Realities, Praeger Publishers, Westport, Connecticut (1999), pp. 125-156. 

"The Rebirth of African Liberalism, " Journal of Democracy, (April 1998), pp. 18-31

"Ghana's Encouraging Elections: The Challenges Ahead." Journal of Democracy, Vol. 8, No. 2 (1997), pp. 78-91.  

"The Politics of Economic Renewal in Africa" with Nicolas van de Walle, in Benno Ndulu and Nicolas van de Walle (eds), Agenda For Africa's Economic Renewal, Overseas Development Council, Washington, D.C. /Transaction Publishers, New Brunswick (1996) pp. 211-239.

"Civil Society in Africa," Journal of Democracy Vol. 7, No. 2 (April 1996), pp. 118-132. 

"Ghana: Adjustment, State Rehabilitation and Democratization," in T. Mkandawire and A. Olukoshi (eds.), Between Repression and Liberalization:  The Politics of Structural Adjustment in Africa, Codesria, Dakar (1995), pp 217-229.

"Associational Life, Civil Society and Democratization in Ghana," in John Harbeson, Donald Rothchild, and Naomi Chazan (eds.), Civil Society and the State in Africa, Lynne Rienner Publishers (1994), pp. 125-148
"Ghana's Uncertain Political Opening," Journal of Democracy, Vol. 5, No. 2 (1994), pp. 75-86.

Ghana Under PNDC Rule, Codesria, London, (1993).

"State Enterprise Divestiture:  Recent Ghanaian Experience," in Donald Rothchild (ed.), Ghana:  The Political Economy of Recovery, Lynne Rienner Publishers (1991), pp 193-208.

"Public Administration in Ghana," with Donald Rothchild, in V. Subramanian (ed.), Public Administration in the Third World, Greenwood Press, Westport (1990), pp. 229-257.

"Economic Recovery and Politics in the PNDC's Ghana," Journal of Commonwealth and Comparative Politics, Vol. XXVII, No. 3 (November, 1990), pp. 328-343

"Populism in Ghana and Burkina Faso," (with Donald Rothchild), Current History, Vol. 88, No. 538 (May 1989), pp. 221-224 and 241-244.

"Problems in Ghanaian Agriculture and Responses of Post-Colonial Regimes," in K. A. Ninsin and E. Hansen (eds.), The State, Development and Politics in Ghana, Codesria, London (1989), pp. 222-241.

"Ghana's Economic Decline and Development Strategies," with Donald Rothchild, in John Ravenhill (ed.), Africa in Economic Crisis, Macmillan Press (1986), pp. 254-85.

"Rawlings, Populism, and the Civil Liberties Tradition in Ghana," (with Donald Rothchild), Issue, Vol. XXII, No. 3 (Fall/Winter 1983), pp. 64-75.

"Ghana's Return to Constitutional Rule," (with Donald Rothchild), Africa Today, Vol. 28, No. 1 (1982), pp. 3-16.

References 

Ghanaian scientists
1953 births
Living people
University of Ghana alumni
University of California, Davis alumni
Academic staff of the University of Ghana